Big Sexy Land is the debut studio album by industrial rock band Revolting Cocks, released through Wax Trax! Records in 1986. This is the only album to feature the group's founding lineup of Luc van Acker, Richard 23 and Alain Jourgensen.

Background 
The album's title is a reference to a strip club in West Berlin. Jourgensen said that the club's large, neon sign was "the biggest capitalistic tease" for citizens in East Germany. The album was recorded in 1985 at ICP Studios in Brussels. Van Acker attributed the album's mixing to Jourgensen's sessions with Adrian Sherwood on Twitch.  Van Acker said Jourgensen surreptitiously took notes on Sherwood's settings, but, without any context for the numbers, they had to later guess at what the settings were for, such as reverb and delay time.  According to van Acker, Jourgensen did not appear as a musician on the album because he was still under contract by Sire.  After Jourgensen released a dub remix of "You Often Forget" without the band's input, Richard 23 quit.

Additional information 
The track "We Shall Cleanse the World" includes a sample of the title phrase taken from the film The Omega Man starring Charlton Heston.

The title of the track "Attack Ships on Fire" is taken from dialog in the film Blade Runner.

"38" is a reference to the victims of the Heysel Stadium Disaster which occurred on May 29, 1985. Although the final death toll in the disaster was actually 39.

Reception 

The Rough Guide to Rock described the album as a "more fluid Nitzer Ebb" evocative of current trends in electronic music.  AllMusic wrote that it is "a distinguished debut from a 'side project' that occasionally surpasses the day-job work that its members became famous for".

Track listing

Singles
No Devotion (1985)

 "No Devotion"
 "Attack Ships..."
 "...On Fire"

Personnel

Revolting Cocks
 Luc van Acker – vocals, guitars
 Richard 23 – vocals, programming
 Alain Jourgensen – production, engineering

Additional personnel 
 Bill Rieflin – drums ("You Often Forget")
 John Mathias – additional engineering
 Patrick Codenys – additional keyboards (2, 4, 6)
 Jim Nash – cover
 Brian Shanley – cover
 Phil Austin – mastering

References

Revolting Cocks albums
1986 debut albums
Albums produced by Al Jourgensen
Wax Trax! Records albums